The San Diego Botanic Garden, formerly Quail Botanical Gardens, is a botanical garden in Encinitas, California, United States. At , the garden includes rare bamboo groves (said to be the largest bamboo collection in the United States), desert gardens, a tropical rainforest, California native plants, Mediterranean climate landscapes, and a subtropical fruit garden. The name of the facility was changed in 2009 to better reflect the garden's status as a regional attraction.

Located 30 minutes north of San Diego in Encinitas, California, San Diego Botanic Garden features numerous exhibits, including rare bamboo groves, desert gardens, a tropical rainforest, California native plants, Mediterranean climate landscapes, succulent gardens, an herb garden, firesafe landscaping, a subtropical fruit garden, and native coastal sage natural areas. The Hamilton Children's Garden was opened in June 2011, the largest interactive children's garden on the West Coast.

Until 1957 the gardens were the private estate of Ruth Baird Larabee, at which time she donated her house and grounds to the County of San Diego. The Quail Botanical Gardens Foundation was established in 1961. In March 1970, the Quail Botanic Garden opened as a public botanic garden. The name was changed in 2009 to San Diego Botanic Garden.

Today the gardens include over 5,000 varieties of plants from all over the world including tropical, subtropical, and California native plants. Collections include a tropical plant exhibit in the Dickinson Family Education Conservatory (opened in 2020), the climate-based gardens for the New World and Old World Desert, Coastal sage scrub, Sub-Tropical Fruit, a Pinetum, a Palm Canyon, as well as geographically organized gardens for Africa, Australia, Arid Madagascar Garden, Arid South America, the Canary Islands, Cape South Africa, Central America, the Himalayas, the Mediterranean, the Middle East, New Zealand, the Pan-Tropical Rainforest with a 60-foot waterfall.

Plant varieties include fuchsias, hibiscus, bamboos, proteas, cacti and succulents, as well as other drought-resistant plants including Australian shrubs. Herbs, water plants, wildflowers, perennials, brugmansias, cork oaks, and palms are also featured. 

Of particular interest is the maturing Cork Oak (Quercus suber) forest. Paths wind through a cluster of twisted and majestic Cork Oaks. Cork Oaks groves in other parts of the world are still harvested for their cork (bark) that is used in for corks placed in wine bottles, as well as for purses, jewelry and wallets.

Gallery

See also 
 List of botanical gardens in the United States
 California native plants

References

External links 
 Official San Diego Botanic Garden website

Botanical gardens in California
Parks in San Diego County, California
Encinitas, California